WZNX (106.7 FM) is a mainstream rock radio station. It is licensed in Sullivan, Illinois, and is owned by the Cromwell Radio Group, through licensee The Cromwell Group, Inc. of Illinois.

History
WZNX calls itself The Fox, a reference to the X in its call letters, and the F in the call letters of its onetime sister-station, WZNF (95.3 FM) licensed out of Rantoul, Illinois.  The Cromwell Radio Group bought the radio station in the mid-1990s, kept the call letters and the "Fox" identifier. Among the disc jockeys during this time were Chris Anderson, Brian Rickman, Lars Christiansen and Wes Adams.  Current disc jockeys include Scott Lithgow and Storm . During the stations highest Arbitron ratings the Gonzo Morning Show was on the air.  Hosted by Brad Wheeling, "Rockin Rod" Hall and Chris "Monkey Boy" Knyght.  The trio was split by corporate buy out and satellite moved in, bringing Bob and Tom, and WZNX has been a Bob and Tom Show affiliate from the late 1990s, until late 2013, when Bob and Tom was replaced with The Free Beer and Hot Wings Show.

Previous logo
 (WZNX-HD3 logo under previous "Buzz" active rock format)

References

External links

ZNX
Mainstream rock radio stations in the United States
Radio stations established in 1990
1990 establishments in Illinois